134th may refer to:

134th (2/1st Hampshire) Brigade, formation of the Territorial Force of the British Army
134th (Loyal Limerick) Regiment of Foot, infantry regiment of the British Army, created in 1794 and disbanded in 1796
134th Air Refueling Wing, unit located at McGhee Tyson ANGB, Tennessee
134th Armoured Division Freccia, Cavalry Division of the Italian Army during World War II
134th Battalion (48th Highlanders), CEF, unit in the Canadian Expeditionary Force during the Great War
134th Delaware General Assembly, meeting of the legislative branch of the Delaware state government
134th Fighter Squadron, unit which flies the F-16C Fighting Falcon
134th Georgia General Assembly succeeded the 133rd and served as the precedent for the 135th General Assembly in 1979
134th Illinois Volunteer Infantry Regiment, infantry regiment that served in the Union Army during the American Civil War
134th Infantry Division (Wehrmacht), German division in World War II
134th Infantry Regiment (United States), infantry regiment in the Army National Guard
134th Kentucky Derby or 2008 Kentucky Derby
134th meridian east, line of longitude across the Arctic Ocean, Asia, Australia, the Indian Ocean, the Southern Ocean, and Antarctica
134th meridian west, line of longitude across the Arctic Ocean, North America, the Pacific Ocean, the Southern Ocean, and Antarctica
134th Ohio Infantry (or 134th OVI), infantry regiment in the Union Army during the American Civil War
134th Pennsylvania Infantry, infantry regiment in the Union Army during the American Civil War
134th Street (Manhattan), New York, United States
Pennsylvania's 134th Representative District or Pennsylvania House of Representatives, District 134

See also
134 (number)
AD 134, the year 134 (CXXXIV) of the Julian calendar
134 BC